Goodenia chthonocephala is a species of flowering plant in the family Goodeniaceae and is endemic to a restricted area of the Northern Territory. It is a small, annual, cushion-like herb with linear to lance-shaped leaves and groups of flowers held at ground level.

Description
The flowers are sessile arranged in leaf axils in heads at ground level.

Taxonomy and naming
Goodenia chthonocephala was first formally described in 1990 by Roger Charles Carolin in the journal Telopea from material collected by Peter Latz on Cox River Station in 1977. The specific epithet (chthonocephala) means "earth-head", referring to the groups of flowers at ground level.

Distribution and habitat
This goodenia grows is only known from the type collection in a damp situation on Cox River Station in the north of the Northern Territory.

Conservation status
Goodenia chthonocephala is classified as "data deficient" under the Northern Territory Government Territory Parks and Wildlife Conservation Act 1976.

References

chthonocephala
Flora of the Northern Territory
Plants described in 1990
Taxa named by Roger Charles Carolin
Endemic flora of Australia